Bad City Blues is a 1999 American drama and crime film directed by Michael Stevens.This film starring Michael Massee, Michael McGrady, Judith Hoag, Jim Metzler and Simon Billig in the lead roles.

About the film
Adapted from a novel by British author Tim Willocks, this is a crime film about redemption and revenge. There are four stories woven together which originate from a bank robbery gone wrong. The wife of the banker is also the girlfriend of the gang leader who is behind the robbery. She becomes injured and begs the town doctor for help. A corrupt police captain in town kills her banker-husband and then focuses on the town doctor to get to the robbers. It was described by The Los Angeles Times as a dark gritty film about a bank heist gone wrong.

Production
The film was directed by Michael Stevens who along with Tim Willocks produced it. The executive producer was Tom Scott.
The music for the film is by Mick Taylor.

Reception
The film premiered at the El Capitan Theatre in Los Angeles.

Cast

References

External links
 
 Variety review, Nov 7, 1999 by Todd McCarthy

1990s English-language films
1999 films
1999 crime drama films
American crime drama films
1990s American films